C. indica most often refers to:
 Cannabis indica, a plant species better known as marijuana

C. indica may also refer to:
 Caloria indica, a sea slug species
 Canis indica, the Indian wolf, a possible distinct species of wolves
 Canna indica, the saka siri, Indian shot, canna, bandera, chancle, coyol, platanillo or kardal, a plant species
 Chalcophaps indica, the emerald dove, a bird species found in tropical southern Asia
 Chitra indica, a turtle species found in the major rivers of India and Pakistan
 Cnemaspis indica, the Indian day gecko, a gecko species found in India
 Compsaditha indica, a pseudoscorpion species in the genus Compsaditha found in India
 Cylindraspis indica, an extinct giant tortoise species

Synonyms
 Calosanthes indica, a synonym for Oroxylum indicum, a tree species
 Coccinia indica, a synonym for Coccinia grandis
 Cosmophila indica, a synonym for Anomis flava, the cotton looper or tropical anomis, a moth species
 Cupressus sempervirens var. indica, a synonym for Cupressus torulosa, a tree species

See also
 Indica (disambiguation)